Ptychopariidae is a family of trilobites, containing the following genera:

Achlysopsis
Altikolia
Altitudella
Amecephalites
Asthenopsis
Austinvillia
Balangcunaspis
Bashania
Bathyholcus
Bathyocos
Billingsaspis
Binodaspis
Blairella – see Neoblairella 
Bolaspidina
Brunswickia
Bulkuraspis
Caborcella
Callidaspina
Callidaspis
Cathayanella
Champlainia
Chengshanaspis
Chinghisicus
Chunghwaella
Conopolus
Dananzhuangia
Deltina
Douposiella
Elrathina
Entsyna
Eodouposiella
Eokochaspis
Eosoptychoparia
Eospencia
Eurostina
Finecrestia
Gaotanaspis
Gaphuraspis
Gedongaspis
Gunnia
Hadrocephalites
Hadrokraspedon
Hamptonella
Hejinaspis
Hemicricometopus
Hewenia
Holasaphus
Horbusonia
Illtydaspis
Jangudaspis
Jialaopsis
Jianchangia
Jimaoshania
Jiumenia
Kermanella
Kochaspis
Kochiella
Kochiellina
Kochina
Kounamkites
Kunmingaspis
Laminurus
Laoyingshania
Lianglangshania
Loriella
Luguoia
Luxella
Lyriaspis
Majiangia
Manailina
Meitania
Metisella – see Rasettiella 
Mexicella
Monanocephalus
Mopanshania
Mrassina
Mufushania
Nangaocephalus
Nangaoia
Nangaops
Nanoqia
Nassovia
Nelsonia – see Paleonelsonia 
Neoblairella 
Neoregina 
Neokochina
Nyella – Palmerara 
Olenekina
Onchocephalites
Ontoella
Orienturus
Orlovia
Orloviella
Pachyaspidella
Pachyaspis
Palmerara 
Palmeraspis
Paleonelsonia 
Panacus
Paraeosoptychoparia
Paragunnia
Paramecephalus
Paraperiomma
Paraplagiura
Parapoulsenia
Parashuiyuella
Paraziboaspis
Perimetopus
Periommella
Piazella
Pingluaspis
Piochaspis
Plagiura
Pokrovskayaspis
Poulsenella
Poulsenia
Poulseniella
Probowmania
Probowmaniella
Probowmanops
Proliostracus
Promeitania
?Protohedinia
Pseudoliostracus
Psilostracus
Ptychoparella
Ptychoparia
Qiaotouaspis
Qingshuiheia
Rasettiella 
Reedus
Regina – Neoregina 
Regius
Runnania
Salankanaspis
Sanhuangshania
Sanwania
Schistometopus
Semisphaerocephalus
Seriaspis
Shanganella
Shantungaspis
Shuiyuella
Sinoptychoparia
Spencella
Spencia
Stoecklinia
Sujaraspis
Suluktella
Taijiangia
Taniaspidella
?Townleyella
Trachyostracus
Trigonyangaspis
Tukalandaspis
?Ulrichaspis
Variopelta
Vermontella
Vica
Volocephalina
Wanhuaia
Weijiaspis
Wuhaina
Xiangshanaspis
Xingrenaspis
Yaoyiayuella
Yohoaspis
Yuknessaspis
Ziboaspidella
Ziboaspis

References

 
Ptychoparioidea
Trilobite families